Ronald Louis Caldwell (December 27, 1948 – December 10, 1967) was an American soul and R&B musician.

A keyboard player, Caldwell was the only white member of the Bar-Kays musical group based in Memphis, Tennessee. The group recorded with and also accompanied singer Otis Redding. According to James Alexander, Caldwell was fully accepted within Memphis' black community, to the point that Caldwell felt free to go about in public with his black girlfriend, despite the attitude of racial segregation prevalent at that time.

Caldwell died on December 10, 1967, seventeen days prior to his 19th birthday, of a plane crash in Lake Monona with Redding and three other band members (Phalon Jones, Carl Cunningham and Jimmie King), their valet Matthew Kelly and the pilot Richard Fraser while on their way to a performance in Madison, Wisconsin.

Caldwell is interred in the Memorial Park Cemetery in Memphis.

External links

1948 births
1967 deaths
Victims of aviation accidents or incidents in the United States
American funk keyboardists
Musicians from Memphis, Tennessee
The Bar-Kays members
20th-century American musicians
20th-century American keyboardists
Burials at Memorial Park Cemetery (Memphis, Tennessee)

Musicians killed in aviation accidents or incidents

Accidental deaths in Wisconsin
Accidents and incidents involving the Beechcraft Model 18
Victims of aviation accidents or incidents in 1967